Remi Gribonval from the INRIA, Rennes Cedex, France was named Fellow of the Institute of Electrical and Electronics Engineers (IEEE) in 2014 for contributions to the theory and applications of sparse signal processing.

References 

Fellow Members of the IEEE
Living people
French electrical engineers
Year of birth missing (living people)
Place of birth missing (living people)
21st-century French engineers